Roann-Paw Paw Township Public Library is a historic Carnegie library building located at Roann, Wabash County, Indiana.  It was built in 1916, and is a one-story, rectangular, American Craftsman style brick building over a semi-recessed basement. It has a hipped roof of clay tile and wooden eave brackets.  The building feature two enclosed entries and limestone detailing.  It was built in part with an $8,000 grant from the Carnegie Foundation.

It was listed on the National Register of Historic Places in 2002.  It is located in the Roann Historic District.

The Roann-Paw Paw Township Public Library remains an active lending library; it is one of three public library systems in Wabash County.

References

External links
 Library website

Carnegie libraries in Indiana
Libraries on the National Register of Historic Places in Indiana
Bungalow architecture in Indiana
Library buildings completed in 1916
Buildings and structures in Wabash County, Indiana
National Register of Historic Places in Wabash County, Indiana